The  Argus-Courier is an American weekly paid newspaper which serves the city of Petaluma and surrounding Sonoma County, California. It is published weekly on Thursday, with an estimated circulation of 7,400.

It is edited by Matt Brown.

History
The Courier traces its history to 1876, with its establishment by W. M. Shattuck, and after a series of sales was purchased in 1900 by the Olmstead family. The Argus dates back to 1859, founded by J. J. Pennypacker.

The two papers co-existed for some time, with their respective leadership playing prominent roles in the newly formed North of Bay Counties Press Association. In 1928, the Olmsteds bought the Argus, and the Argus-Courier was first issued in July 1928 after the merger of the two papers.

In 1995, the Olmsted family sold the paper to Scripps League Newspapers. In 1993, the paper, which had been daily since 1928, cut down to a two day a week schedule, citing financial pressures. The move left Santa Rosa's Press Democrat as the county's only daily. Pulitzer Publishing Company bought Scripps League for about $230 million in 1996. The New York Times Company bought the Argus-Courier in 2001.

The New York Times Company sold its regional papers to Halifax Media in 2012; Halifax sold the Argus-Courier to Sonoma Media Investments later that year.

National coverage and awards 
Argus-Courier reporting has been featured in national news reporting, as with the story of Petaluma resident Polly Klaas's murder, where the paper served as a source of reporting, and its staff served as commentators on the culture of the town.

In 2017, the Petaluma Argus-Courier won 1st place in the General Excellence category in its division of  California's Better Newspapers Contest, as well as awards in environmental reporting, breaking news, and online photo essays.

References

Sonoma County, California
Weekly newspapers published in California

External links 
Official site